WLTF is a radio station licensed to Martinsburg, West Virginia. Owned by the West Virginia Radio Corporation, it broadcasts an Adult Contemporary format.

Its signal covers the "four state" region, east into Washington, DC, south to Luray, Virginia, west into Grantsville, Maryland, and north into Altoona, Pennsylvania, although the station primarily targets Martinsburg.

History
On October 31, 2014, Prettyman Broadcasting announced the sale of WLTF to West Virginia Radio Corporation (WVRC) for an unknown sum. Included in the same were sister stations WEPM and WICL. WVRC assumed control of the stations, through a Local marketing agreement, on November 1. The purchase was consummated on February 13, 2015, at a price of $3 million.

On November 24, 2017, the station flipped to a CHR format and changed its call sign to WKMZ-FM. The station was unable to reclaim its legacy WKMZ callsign due to the existence of WKMZ-LP in Ruckersville, Virginia.

On April 24, 2019, the station changed its call sign back to WLTF.

On April 30, 2019, WLTF dropped its Contemporary Hit Radio format as "97.5 WKMZ" and began stunting with Christmas Music as "Santa 97.5".  At Midnight, on May 1, 2019, the stunting ended and the format of WLTF flipped to Adult Contemporary branded as "Today's 97-5".

References

External links
 Today's 97-5 Online
 

Mainstream adult contemporary radio stations in the United States
Martinsburg, West Virginia
LTF
Radio stations established in 1951
1951 establishments in West Virginia